The canton of Pontorson is an administrative division of the Manche department, northwestern France. Its borders were modified at the French canton reorganisation which came into effect in March 2015. Its seat is in Pontorson.

It consists of the following communes:

Aucey-la-Plaine 
Beauvoir
Céaux
Courtils
Crollon
Ducey-Les Chéris
Huisnes-sur-Mer
Juilley
Marcilly
Le Mesnil-Ozenne
Le Mont-Saint-Michel
Poilley
Pontaubault
Pontorson
Précey
Sacey
Saint-Ovin
Saint-Quentin-sur-le-Homme
Servon
Tanis
Le Val-Saint-Père

References

Cantons of Manche